Anita Sood is a former national woman swimming champion of India. She became the fastest Asian swimmer to cross the English Channel with a time of 8 hours and 15 minutes on August 17, 1987, becoming the 333rd person to swim the channel. She was awarded Arjuna Award for her achievements.
She is coached by Sandeep Digvikar.

Achievements 
Swimming since 1975, Anita first climbed to fame at the Trivandrum national age group meet in 1977, where she won nine medals - four golds, four silvers and a bronze - while participating in the under-13 category. A year later she bagged six titles in the Maharashtra state meet in Bombay and firmly established herself as a new phenomenon by bettering two records and beating long-reigning senior national champion Smita Desai to win the 100-metres freestyle.

Personal life 
Anita is from Maharashtra.

She is married to Abhijit Mankar, resides in Los Angeles CA, and has 2 children.

References

External links 
 
 

Living people
Indian female swimmers
Recipients of the Arjuna Award
Female long-distance swimmers
Year of birth missing (living people)
Place of birth missing (living people)
English Channel swimmers